{{DISPLAYTITLE:C24H40O3}}
The molecular formula C24H40O3 (molar mass: 376.57 g/mol, exact mass: 376.2977 u) may refer to:

 CP 55,940
 Lithocholic acid (LCA), or 3α-hydroxy-5β-cholan-24-oic acid

Molecular formulas